Aucapata Municipality is municipality of the Muñecas Province in the La Paz Department, Bolivia. Its capital is Aucapata.

Languages 
The languages spoken in the Aucapata Municipality are mainly Quechua, Spanish and Aymara.

Places of interest 
 Iskanwaya

References 

 obd.descentralizacion.gov.bo

Municipalities of La Paz Department (Bolivia)